Leadfoot is an American stoner rock band based in Raleigh, North Carolina whose original members included vocalist Karl Agell and bassist Phil Swisher, both former members of the sludge metal band Corrosion of Conformity. They were called Loose Cannon at first but learned that another band had had that name.

Discography

References

Musical groups from Raleigh, North Carolina
American sludge metal musical groups
American stoner rock musical groups
Musical groups established in 1995